An executory contract is a contract that has not yet been fully performed or fully executed. It is a contract in which both sides still have important performance remaining. However, an obligation to pay money, even if such obligation is material, does not usually make a contract executory. An obligation is material if a breach of contract would result from the failure to satisfy the obligation. A contract that has been fully performed by one party but not by the other party is not an executory contract.  See, generally, Countryman, Vern, "Executory Contracts in Bankruptcy: Part I" (1973). Minnesota Law Review. 2459. https://scholarship.law.umn.edu/mlr/2459 and "Executory Contracts in Bankruptcy: Part II" (1974). Minnesota Law Review. 2460.https://scholarship.law.umn.edu/mlr/2460.

In US bankruptcy law
In US bankruptcy law, "executory contract" assumes a special meaning, a contract in which continuing obligations exist on both sides of the contract at the time of the bankruptcy petition. It still requires both debtor and counterparty to make further performance. A trustee or debtor in possession may assume any prepetition executory contract or unexpired lease of the debtor, preserving obligations of both the debtor and the counterparts by the bankruptcy process. If he rejects it, there is a breach of contract as of the date of the petition. Affirmation and rejection are subject to court approval. .

Installment contracts
Many installment (or instalment) contracts are commonly executory such as installment credit loans, period loan payments, mortgages,  paychecks, and contracts for the delivery of goods or the performance of services over a period of time in discrete elements.

Missed deliveries under an instalment have on occasion given rise to the legal question of whether they are indicative of a breach of contract, allowing the other party to terminate the contract, or whether the contract should continue. In the case of Maple Flock Co Ltd v Universal Furniture Products (Wembley) Ltd., decided in 1934, Hewart LCJ used reasoning drawn from an earlier case, Freeth v Burr, and approved in Mersey Steel and Iron Company v. Naylor, Benzon and Co.: “That the true question is whether the acts and conduct of the party evince an intention no longer to be bound by the contract". In applying this reasoning to a situation of a missed delivery, the court concluded that the main issues were (i) the ratio quantitively between the breach and the contract as a whole, and (ii) the degree of probability or improbability, that the omission might be repeated. In this case, the 16th delivery of flock out of 67 deliveries planned for the contract was defective: the ratio was low and the existence of a good quality control system confirmed that the defective provision was unlikely to be repeated.

See also
 Bankruptcy in the United States
 Chapter 11, Title 11, United States Code
 Charging order
 Executory interest
 Future interest
 Rule against perpetuities

References

Contract law